The Mountbatten Single Member Constituency is a single member constituency in the central-southeastern part of Singapore. The current Member of Parliament for the constituency is People's Action Party (PAP) Lim Biow Chuan.

Town Council 

Mountbatten SMC is managed by the Marine Parade Town Council.

Members of Parliament

Electoral results

Elections in 1950s

Elections in 1960s

Notes: SPA joins UMNO-MCA-MIC alliance to form SA in 1963 GE.

Elections in 1970s

Elections in 1980s

Elections in 1990s

Elections in 2010s

Elections in 2020s

References

2020 General Election's result
2011 General Election's result
1991 General Election's result
1988 General Election's result
1984 General Election's result
1980 General Election's result
1976 General Election's result
1972 General Election's result
1968 General Election's result
1963 General Election's result
1959 General Election's result

Singaporean electoral divisions
Kallang
Marine Parade
Geylang